Cessnock, an electoral district of the Legislative Assembly in the Australian state of New South Wales has had two incarnations, the first from 1913 to 1920, the second from 1927 to the present.


Election results

Elections in the 2010s

2019

2015

2011

Elections in the 2000s

2007

2003

Elections in the 1990s

1999

1995

1991

Elections in the 1980s

1988

1984

1981

1981 by-election

Elections in the 1970s

1978

1976

1973

1971

Elections in the 1960s

1968

1965

1962

Elections in the 1950s

1959

1956

1953

1950

Elections in the 1940s

1949 by-election

1947

1944

1941

Elections in the 1930s

1938

1935

1932

1930

Elections in the 1920s

1927
This section is an excerpt from 1927 New South Wales state election § Cessnock

1920-1927
District abolished

Elections in the 1910s

1917
This section is an excerpt from 1917 New South Wales state election § Cessnock

1913

References

New South Wales state electoral results by district